Melissa Newman is an American actress who, as a teen, made her Hollywood film debut in The Undefeated (1969) starring John Wayne, Rock Hudson, Lee Meriweather, and Merlin Olsen, among others.

Career
Newman's career after her film debut consisted of appearances in television movies and series, such as Bonanza, Gunsmoke, Lou Grant, Starsky & Hutch, Getting Away from It All, River of Gold, and Revenge of the Stepford Wives.

She returned to the big screen in the 1983 film One Dark Night, after which, in 1985, she performed as a voice actress in the anime series Robotech and in the English dub version of the animated television movie, Time Patrol.

Roles
In the 1971 Bonanza episode "A Time to Die" she plays the role of Lori who is engaged to be married, while her mother Mrs. April Christopher (played by Vera Miles) is succumbing to the effects of a bite from a rabid wolf.

In the made for TV comedy movie Getting Away from It All (1972), she portrays April Brodey, the bikini-clad daughter of the owner of the local store. She becomes enamored of Larry Hagman's character Fred Clark, and swims out to the island to give him and his wife Helen (Barbara Feldon) a tour of the property they have purchased.

Also in the 1972 Gunsmoke episode, "The Wedding" she portrays 20-year old Donna Clayton who wants to marry Corey Soames (played by Sam Elliott). Newman (as Karen Guilfoyle) would again appear with Sam Elliot (as Luther Wilkes) a year later in a 1973 episode of Hawkins, however not as a love-interest.

Also in 1973, she had a role in the premiere episode of The New Perry Mason as Nita More, secretary to Jules Barron (Paul Richards), in which she had three scenes; in an office setting, out and about with Mason's detective Paul, and on the stand testifying in a courtroom setting.

In 1976 she plays Amy, a cafe waitress, who tips off Starsky & Hutch that a regular patron who is a security guard on an armored truck is late, and that she is worried enough to call the police.

Newman plays Kim Ballard in the 1978 Lou Grant episode "Sect" as a woman who has come out of the Hare Krishna movement, while her brother remains with the sect.

Branching out into the mystery/thriller genre in Revenge of the Stepford Wives (1980), she portrayed Muffin Sheridan, who interviews for the job of assistant to investigative reporter Kaye Foster (Sharon Gless), and has various scenes throughout the movie.

In 1983 she returned to the big-screen in the horror film One Dark Night as Mrs. Olivia McKenna, wife of Allan McKenna (portrayed by Adam West), and daughter of the villain, Karl Raymarseivich Raymar.

Newman was the voice of Dana Sterling in 1985 for twenty-four episodes of Robotech Part 2: The Masters. In the same year, she voiced Ginny in Time Patrol in which she is credited as Lisa Mannon, instead of Melissa Newman.

Filmography
 The Ghost & Mrs. Muir (1968) "Way Off Broadway" (S1E9) as Nancy 
 The Undefeated (1969) as Charlotte Langdon 
 Bracken's World (1970) "A Beginning, a Middle and an End" (S1E23) as Aileen Davies 
 Julia (1970) "The Switch Sitters" as Wilma 
 Nanny and the Professor (1970) "The Games Families Play" (S1E11) as Carol 
 Bonanza (1971) "A Time to Die" (S12E25) as Lori 
 River of Gold (1971) as Julie 
 The Jimmy Stewart Show (1971) as college student, Ida Levin 
 "By Way of Introduction" (S1E1)
 "Cock-a-doodle Don't" (S1E14)
 Getting Away from It All (1972) as April Brodey 
 Gunsmoke (1972) "The Wedding" (S17E24) as Donna Clayton 
 Hawkins (1973) "Die, Darling, Die" (S1E2) as Karen Guilfoyle 
 The New Perry Mason (1973) "The Case of the Cagey Cager" (S1E1) as Nita Moore 
 Starsky & Hutch (1976) "The Hostages" (S1E15) as Amy 
 Lou Grant (1978) "Sect" (S1E18) as Kim Ballard 
 Revenge of the Stepford Wives (1980) as Muffin Sheridan 
 One Dark Night (1983) as Olivia McKenna 
 Robotech (1985) as Dana Sterling (Voice)
 24 Episodes in Part 2: "The Masters"
 Time Patrol (1985) as Ginny (Voice) (credited as Lisa Mannon)

References

External links

Living people
American film actresses
American television actresses
20th-century American actresses
Date of birth missing (living people)
American voice actresses
Year of birth missing (living people)